Trixie Minx is a burlesque dancer, producer, healthcare advocate, and cultural ambassador based in New Orleans, LA. As a performer she is best known for her unique style of striptease combining comedy with classic burlesque. She is recognized for her collaborations with musicians and charitable organizations (such as Comic Relief, Preservation Hall Jazz Band, The New Orleans Bingo! Show, Ascona Jazz Festival, & New Orleans Musicians' Clinic) as well as her devotion to preservation & growth of New Orleans arts and culture. She produces multiple New Orleans based circus art and burlesque shows and designs custom entertainment for both public and private events.

Early life 
Born as Alexis Jasmine Graber on May 5, 1981 in Miami, FL she was enamored with ballet as a child. She began her training locally at Miami Ballet, Martha Mahr's School of Ballet, and later as a teenager with New World School of the Arts & Miami City Ballet School as a scholarship student. Summers were spent studying her craft at Houston Ballet Academy (1993 & 1994), with Suzanne Farrell at the Kennedy Center (1995, 1996), and at the American Ballet Theatre (1996, 1997, 1998). Upon graduating high school she joined Nashville Ballet as a trainee where she danced for 2 years until an ankle injury & eating disorder abruptly ended her career as a ballerina. In 2001 she moved to New Orleans, where she worked as a Pilates instructor, and started exploring alternate dance styles (including swing, folk dance, and eventually burlesque). Post-Hurricane Katrina she decided to devote her life to burlesque & New Orleans as Trixie Minx.

Burlesque 
Trixie's first performance as burlesque dancer was in December 2005. Trixie Minx started as a regular cast member in Bustout Burlesque at Tipitina's in the French Quarter where she performed for 6 months. Wanting to explore the creative versatility through the art of tease she began producing her own shows in September 2006. An active member of the New Orleans Burlesque revival, Trixie continued to create shows and has since gone on to perform throughout the world.

Productions 
Trixie Minx currently produces several ongoing productions in New Orleans. Fleur de Tease, Burgundy Burlesque, Burlesque Ballroom, and her Cabaret series at the Orpheum Theater. She created Fantasy for Couples Cruises which sails the Gulf and the Caribbean. Trixie also performs in The Burlesque Show at the Borgata Casino in Atlantic City, NJ.

Cabaret Series at Orpheum Theater 
In 2016 the recently renovated Orpheum Theater approached Trixie to create a series of shows to bring back the glamour of the once lost eras of vaudeville and vintage burlesque on the stage. Her productions Cupid's Cabaret and Cocktail Cabaret were noteworthy in that they were large scale artistic productions featuring burlesque, actors, musicians, aerialists, & performance artists on a grand stage, further validating the work of these performers in New Orleans to have artistic merit beyond simple entertainment.

Burlesque Ballroom 
Burlesque Ballroom debuted in December 2010 and continues to run weekly every Friday at the Royal Sonesta New Orleans on Bourbon Street. This intimate production turns the Jazz Playhouse into a burlesque speakeasy where dancers perform throughout the room to live jazz & blues music. Featuring a rotating cast of New Orleans and international touring burlesque performers, this is a unique perspective on the various types of beauty & styles of classic burlesque. Historically, Burlesque Ballroom is significant as it is the only weekly show where burlesque & live music come together once again as it did during the original heyday of 1950s Bourbon Street burlesque culture.

Burgundy Burlesque 
Originally created in 2011 as Creole Sweet Tease, this show was reorganized as Burgundy Burlesque in December 2015 by co-founders Trixie Minx, Kerry Lewis, and Gerald French of the Original Tuxedo Jazz Band. With a heavy influence on the music of New Orleans past & present this production showcases a cast of burlesque dancers that perform in collaboration with the musicians in an improvisational manner. This show runs weekly at the Saint Hotel & Autograph Collection on Canal Street, New Orleans.

The Burlesque Show 
Produced by Allen Valentine, The Burlesque Show, is in its 4th season at the Borgata Hotel and Casino in Atlantic City, NJ. Trixie Minx is a featured burlesque performer in this high energy show that combines burlesque with comic skits, choreographed numbers, and other prominent burlesque dancers Hazel Honeysuckle, Media Noche, Piper Marie, & Rosy Cheeks.

Fantasy 
Designed in 2014 for Couples Cruise, Fantasy is an exotic interpretation on all that is sensual & erotic. This variety style show features contortionists, acro balancers, aerialists in acts that focus on the human experiences of love & lust.

Fleur de Tease 
Trixie Minx's first & flagstaff production, Fleur de Tease started in September 2006 out of her desire to explore a more theatrical and comical side to burlesque within a group dynamic. With a cast of dancers, comedians, magicians, & aerialists Fleur de Tease brings a new elaborate theme show to One Eyed Jacks on Toulouse Street in New Orleans each month (formerly the ShimSham where Ronnie Magri & the Shimshammettes began). Fleur de Tease has become synonymous with the definition of New Orleans Burlesque and has been featured at the New Orleans Jazz & Heritage Festival (with Preservation Hall, Better than Ezra), New Orleans Food & Wine Experience, Tales of the Cocktail, Voodoo Music Experience.

Artistic collaborations 
 Ascona Jazz Festival
 Bella Blue
 Better than Ezra
 Boyfriend 69
 Big Freedia
 Big Sam's Funky Nation
 Camel Toe Lady Steppers
 Contemporary Arts Center
 Dirty Bourbon River Show
 DJ Rusty Lazer
 Glen David Andrews
 Helen Gillet
 Katie Red
 Meschiya Lake
 New Orleans Bingo! Show
 Preservation Hall Jazz Band
 Tennessee Williams Festival 
 Treme Brass Band
 Tony Clifton & Comic Relief
 Yard Dogs Road Show

Notable clients 
 Emeril Lagasse Foundation
 Ink-N-Iron (Los Angeles)
 Link Stryjewski Foundation
 Naughty in N’awlins
 New Orleans Food & Wine Experience
 Porsche
 Sailor Jerry
 St-Germain
 Tales of the Cocktail
 Voodoo Music Experience

Filmography

Modeling 
 Craig Tracy - Body Paint 
 Liz Goldwyn - Prospect New Orleans
 Lena Herzog - 2009
 Trey McIntyre - 2015
 Trashy Diva brand ambassador - 2013 to present

Awards and titles

References

American neo-burlesque performers
1981 births
People from New Orleans
Living people